Broad and Orizaba / Orizaba and Broad stations are a pair of light rail stops on the Muni Metro M Ocean View line, located in the Ingleside neighborhood of San Francisco, California. The inbound stop is located on Broad Street at Orizaba Avenue, while outbound trains stop on Orizaba Avenue at Broad Street. The stops opened with the line on October 6, 1925. The line was replaced with buses on August 6, 1939, but streetcar service resumed on December 17, 1944. The stop has no platforms, trains stop at marked poles and passengers cross a vehicle travel lanes to board or depart trains. The stop is not accessible to people with disabilities.

The stop is also served by the  route which provides service along the M Ocean View line during the early morning when trains do not operate.

References

External links 
SFMTA – Broad St & Orizaba Ave (inbound), Orizaba Ave & Broad St (outbound)
SFBay Transit (unofficial) – Broad St & Orizaba Ave (outbound), Orizaba Ave & Broad St (outbound)

Muni Metro stations